Chenopodium benthamii (Syn. Rhagodia latifolia) is a species of shrub endemic to midwest Western Australia.

Description
It grows as a shrub from 40 centimetres to two metres high, leathery, elliptical leaves, and panicles of green flowers.

Taxonomy
It was first published as a variety of Rhagodia crassifolia by George Bentham in 1870, based on a specimen collected from Dirk Hartog Island by Allan Cunningham. In 1983 Paul G. Wilson promoted it to specific rank. After phylogenetical research, Fuentes-Bazan et al. (2012) included this species in genus Chenopodium as Chenopodium latifolium.but this name was a later homonym and thus illegitimate. In 2017, Iamonico & Mosyakin replaced it by the name Chenopodium benthamii, in honour of George Bentham.

Two subspecies are currently recognised:
the autonym Chenopodium benthamii subsp. benthamii, and Chenopodium benthamii subsp. rectum (Paul G. Wilson) Iamonico & Mosyakin, which was published by Wilson in 1983.

Distribution and habitat
It occurs on coastal sand dunes and limestone cliff in midwest Western Australia, ranging from Geraldton north to the Murchison River.

References

Eudicots of Western Australia
benthamii